The Corsi–Rosenthal Box, also called Corsi–Rosenthal Cube and Comparetto Cube, is a design for a do-it-yourself air purifier that can be built comparatively inexpensively. It was designed during the COVID-19 pandemic, with the goal of reducing the levels of airborne viral particles in indoor settings.

Background and history 
Since COVID-19 was declared a pandemic by the World Health Organization on 11 March 2020, evidence, including increasing amounts of peer-reviewed research, has been accumulating that severe acute respiratory syndrome coronavirus 2 (SARS-CoV-2), the virus causing COVID-19, is airborne. Superspreading events are generally associated with indoor gatherings. In response to the emerging evidence and recommendations of infectious disease researchers, engineers began to consider how improved ventilation may reduce indoor viral loads.

In August 2020, Richard Corsi, an environmental engineer and the incoming Dean of Engineering at the University of California, Davis, (UC Davis) spoke with Wired reporter Adam Rogers about an idea he had for combining multiple store-bought filters with a box fan to improve the efficiency of home-made air filter designs. Rogers contacted Jim Rosenthal, the CEO of filter manufacturer Tex-Air Filters, who had collaborated with Corsi at the University of Texas and in the Texas chapter of the Asthma and Allergy Foundation of America, to run some tests on a single air filter attached to a box fan. Inspired by Corsi's idea to use multiple filters, Rosenthal later came up with a 5-filter design. Rosenthal named it after Corsi, although after a New York Times article mentioned the boxes by that name, Corsi tweeted that Rosenthal really deserved the credit, and that he preferred the name Corsi–Rosenthal Box.

Design 

The original Corsi–Rosenthal Box design consisted of five furnace filters, preferably of effectiveness MERV13 or higher, which formed the sides and bottom of a cube. A  box fan is placed on top and duct taped to the filters, sealing the system so that air is drawn through the filters, up and out of the box. An updated design, also known as a Comparetto Cube, uses four filters and a cardboard base that can sit directly on the floor. Rosenthal later improved the design further by adding shrouds made of cardboard or similar materials to cover the corners of the box fan to improve efficiency and reduce backflow.

The filtration units can be assembled in around fifteen minutes, last for months, and cost between US$50 and $150 in materials.

Efficacy 
Airborne virus particulates range in size from 1 to 50 microns (μm). Rosenthal used his HVAC company's testing equipment to run an informal test of the design, in which he found that around 60% of 1 μm particles were removed by the system, and almost 90% of 10 μm particles were removed. Clean air delivery rates (CADR) of a US$75 design were estimated at between 165 and 239 (depending on fan speed) in an August 2021 case study by UC Davis researchers. In October 2021, Corsi told GBH News that "People are now reporting  in clean air delivery rates. That's phenomenal. That's actually better than a lot of the more expensive HEPA-based portable air cleaners".

In April 2022, a team based at UC Davis published a study of a Corsi–Rosenthal box that used five 2-inch MERV-13 filters. They found that this design's "effective clean air delivery rate [CADR] increase[d] with fan speed, from about 600 to 850 ft3 min−1 (1019 to 1444 m3 h−1)". Based on the cost of their design, this output amounted to $0.08 per CADR, or roughly ten times cheaper than commercial air purifiers, with quieter operation.

A study of a home-built air purifier to remove wildfire smoke, using a box fan and filter mounted in a window, showed that particulate matter between 1 and 10 μm in size was reduced by about 75%. Wired wrote that this study may be suggestive of the efficacy of similar filters to filter virus particles similar in size to the particles studied.

Researchers have expanded studies of these citizen science filtration units to evaluate their efficacy for reducing the levels of airborne volatile chemicals, including semivolatile organic compounds (SVOCs). Dodson and colleagues recently demonstrated that levels of SVOCs are also reduced by a functioning Corsi-Rosenthal Box.

References 

Air filters
Scientific and technical responses to the COVID-19 pandemic
Gas technologies